Shipwreck is a 1931 short animated film starring Oswald the Lucky Rabbit. The film is the 37th Oswald cartoon by Walter Lantz Productions, and the 89th overall.

Plot
Oswald (wearing gloves for the first time) and a parrot are on a log boat, riding on a rough sea. The sea becomes calm moments later. They then notice they are hungry and decided to fish. Oswald casts a line, and the parrot goes down with the hook to find suitable fish. The parrot places the line on a fish, and signals Oswald to reel in. But the fish the parrot selected is too big and therefore drags Oswald below the sea.

The fish has Oswald in his grasp before putting the rabbit in his mouth. The fish, however, finds out he isn't hungry and that he removes Oswald. But he tells he'll be hungry again and will look for them after an hour. Oswald and the parrot figure they need to getaway far and quickly as possible.

Oswald and the parrot go on to wonder the floor of the sea. But instead of continuing, they come across an old organ which catches their curiosity (and also distracts them from their getaway). As Oswald plays the organ, he and the parrot sing the song It Ain't Gonna Rain No Mo'. Other sea creatures join their singing.

The hour has passed, and the fish comes for the two friends. Oswald and the parrot, who are still at the organ, frantically make their move upon seeing their pursuer. While they try to keep distance, the fish manages to get his teeth on the parrot's tail. Oswald refuses to let go of the bird. A tug-of-war ensues until the fish ends up having his skeleton extracted. Oswald and the parrot are relieved of their worries, knowing the now boneless fish can longer go after them.

References

External links
Shipwreck at the Big Cartoon Database
 

1931 films
1931 animated films
1930s American animated films
1930s animated short films
American black-and-white films
Films directed by Walter Lantz
Oswald the Lucky Rabbit cartoons
Universal Pictures short films
Walter Lantz Productions shorts
Universal Pictures animated short films
Animated films about animals
Seafaring films
Animated films about birds
Animated films about fish